HMS E47 was an E-class submarine launched by Fairfield, Govan for the Royal Navy and completed by William Beardmore, Dalmuir. She was launched on 29 May 1916 and was commissioned in October 1916.

Design
She was powered by two  Vickers eight-cylinder two-stroke diesel engines and two  electric motors.

E47 was armed with a 12-pounder  QF gun mounted forward of the conning tower. She had five 18 inch (450 mm) torpedo tubes, two in the bow, one either side amidships, and one in the stern; a total of 10 torpedoes were carried.

E-Class submarines had wireless systems with  power ratings; in some submarines, these were later upgraded to  systems by removing a midship torpedo tube. Their maximum design depth was  although in service some reached depths of below . Some submarines contained Fessenden oscillator systems.

Service history
She was engaged in North Sea patrols off the German and Dutch coasts. Following the resumption of German coastal shipping between Heligoland Bight and Rotterdam, four E-class submarines were sent to intercept. E47 was lost in the North Sea on 20 August 1917. There were no survivors.

Wreck of E47
The deck gun, which was torn off its mounting, probably by a trawler, and was lying beside the wreck, has been salvaged and identifies the wreck.

The wreck bears the Dutch Hydrographic Department wreck number 927, and lies in position .

Casualties
Among the men lost in the sinking of E47 was Lieut. Colin Fraser Creswell, the son of Vice Admiral Sir William Rooke Creswell KCMG, KBE, RAN.

References

External links
 Identifying the wreck of E47
 'Submarine losses 1904 to present day' - Royal Navy Submarine Museum

 

British E-class submarines of the Royal Navy
Ships built in Govan
1916 ships
World War I submarines of the United Kingdom
World War I shipwrecks in the North Sea
Royal Navy ship names
Maritime incidents in 1917
Protected Wrecks of the United Kingdom